Plum Point may refer to:

 Plum Point, Virginia, United States
 Plum Point, Newfoundland and Labrador, Canada
Plum Point (Frank), 1963 painting by Jane Frank